Snowflake is a small community in the Municipality of Pembina in Manitoba, Canada near the Canada–United States border. It is the birthplace of ice hockey player Justin Falk, and was the first ecclesiastical  posting for the sixth Bishop of Calgary, George Reginald Calvert.

Notable residents
Justin Falk NHL player
LeMoine FitzGerald, Group of Seven artist

Climate

See also
 Hannah–Snowflake Border Crossing
List of regions of Manitoba
List of rural municipalities in Manitoba

References

Unincorporated communities in Manitoba